Berlin School of Business and Innovation (BSBI) is a business school run by private, for-profit education company Global University Systems in Berlin, Germany.

History
Berlin School of Business and Innovation was founded in 2018 by Netherlands-based for-profit education company Global University Systems (GUS).

The institution is headed by Sagi Hartov, Israeli cellist and BSBI Executive Chairman, and Aaron Etingen, British-Russian businessman and Global University Systems CEO.

BSBI does  not hold degree-awarding powers in Germany and its programmes are validated by private Italian distance learning institution UniNettuno International Telematic University.

In November 2019, BSBI announced that it had partnered with Concordia University Chicago to deliver programmes at its Berlin campus.

In June 2020, BSBI become an official signatory of the United Nations Principles for Responsible Management Education (UN-PRME) initiative.

Patronage
In November 2018, BSBI appointed Prince Paul of Romania and Princess Lia of Romania as the school’s Patrons, and Princess Madeleine of Bentheim and Steinfurt as Honorary Patron.

In December 2020, BSBI’s patron Prince Paul was sentenced to 3 years and 4 months in prison by the Supreme Court of Romania. He is no longer listed as one of its patrons.

Criticism
In July 2018, an MBA Journal article report claimed that BSBI’s admission requirements were "extremely low" and that the institution was cooperating with a university of "very low standards". BSBI parent company Global University Systems’ chief academic officer Maurits van Rooijen defended BSBI, saying, "We want to offer different access options (academic and financial) and different learning formats for different target groups."

On 22 May 2019, MBA Journal reported that students had told the publication that they had written to BSBI management accusing the institution of poor "quality of teachers and teaching, learning materials and assignments." In the letter, students said, "Often times, we are left to learn from Google and Youtube because of the lack of resources that BSBI provides us."

In July 2019, BSBI students wrote to Poets & Quants, sharing with the education publication that they had written to the institution's management in March 2019 calling their attention to "substandard classes and coursework". Amongst a variety of complaints that were raised, students told the publication, "For 2 to 3 weeks we didn't even have chairs."

Poets & Quants revealed that the BSBI campus in Berlin was a shared floor with another institution, and the schools shared most of the inventory in the campus. The institution moved out a year after BSBI's launch and took all its inventory with it. "They took things like the coffee machine, the glasses, tables, chairs, everything," students told the publication.

References

External links 

Business schools in Germany
Private universities and colleges in Germany
For-profit universities and colleges in Europe